Clovis Cornillac (born 16 August 1968) is a French actor, film director, and screenwriter.

Life and career 
Clovis Cornillac was born to actors Myriam Boyer and Roger Cornillac. He started studying theatre at the age of 14.

He made his debut in cinema in 1984 in Robin Davis's Outlaws. He was noticed by Dominique Besnehard, who introduced him to Peter Brook at the Théâtre des Bouffes du Nord. Cornillac performed in Brook's stage adaptation of Le Mahâbharata.

Cornillac was married to Caroline Proust from 1994 to 2010, with whom he had twin daughters. He married actress Lilou Fogli in 2013, with whom he has a son, Nino, born in 2013.

Filmography

As actor

As director/screenwriter

Theatre 
 1984: Une lune pour les déshérités by Alain Françon
 1990-1991: La dame de chez Maxim's by[Alain Françon
 1997: Edward II by Alain Françon
 1997: Les Petites Heures by Alain Françon
 1998: Surfeurs by Xavier Durringer
 2014: La Contrebasse

Awards and honours 
 Made a Knight of the Ordre des Arts et des Lettres by Culture minister Jean-Jacques Aillagon in 2004.
 2005: Prix Jean Gabin 
 2005: César Award for Best Actor in a Supporting Role for Mensonges et trahisons et plus si affinités...

References

External links 

 
 

1968 births
Living people
Mass media people from Lyon
French male film actors
French male stage actors
20th-century French male actors
21st-century French male actors
French male television actors
Best Supporting Actor César Award winners
French film directors
French male screenwriters
French screenwriters